The Railways in the Pilbara are a collection of railways in the Pilbara region of north-west Western Australia.

History

In 1887, the Cossack Tram opened followed by the Western Australian Government Railways's (WAGR) Marble Bar Railway in 1911. However, these had closed by the 1950s.

Following the opening up of the Pilbara region by the Government of Western Australia for mining in the 1960s, four companies began to mine and export the iron ore. Because of the distances from the mines to the sea ports, railways were built as the most economical method to transport the ore. This came about because it was determined by the iron ore industry that the required duty was going to be "heavy-haul" and it was considered that the track structure and rollingstock needed to be to standard-gauge scale. These "railroads" (as they were called) were built by a joint venture of Morrison-Knudsen, Mannix Contractors of Canada and McDonald Constructions of Australia.
 
The first company to commence operations in June 1966 was Goldsworthy Mining, with a line from Mount Goldsworthy to Finucane Island. In August 1966, Hamersley Iron (a Rio Tinto company) opened a 298-kilometre line from Mount Tom Price to a new port at East Intercourse Island, near Dampier. This was extended shortly after by 100 kilometres to a second mine at Paraburdoo. In March 1969, the Mount Newman Mining joint venture began operating a 427-kilometre line from its Mount Whaleback mine to Port Hedland. The Cliffs Robe River Iron Associates joint venture opened a 162-kilometre line from Mount Enid to Cape Lambert, near Wickham, in July 1972.

Since then, the iron ore trackage has been expanded as new mines have opened. With mergers and takeovers, there has been considerable consolidation of mine (and railroad trackage) ownership, particularly with BHP and Rio Tinto.

On 21 June 2001, eight BHP Billiton GE AC6000CWs combined to set the world record for the longest and heaviest train; hauling a 682-car, 99,734 gross-tonne (82,000 tonnes of ore), 7.3 kilometre-long  train. In April 2008, Fortescue Metals Group opened a line from Cloud Break mine to Port Hedland. In November 2015, Hancock Prospecting opened a 344 kilometre line from Roy Hill.

In 2013, Aurizon in conjunction with Brockman Mining and Atlas Iron under an Alliance Study Agreement, completed a study for a new independent iron ore railway in the Pilbara. , iron ore trackage in the Pilbara was 2,295 kilometres long. It accounted for 94% of all Australian iron ore exports.

In 2020, Rio Tinto completed their "AutoHaul" project fully automating their 200+ engine fleet into a driverless configuration.

Rolling stock
Goldsworthy Mining operated locomotives to the same design as the WAGR H and K classes as well as one EMD JT42C (GML10, based on both the V/Line N and Australian National DL classes).

The other three mining companies operate larger locomotives built to take advantage of the wide (American) loading gauge. Some were built under licence in Australia by AE Goodwin, Comeng, and rebuilt by A Goninan & Co and Clyde Engineering, however most have been imported from the United States.

Locomotives operated have included members of the following classes:

Alco
Alco C628
Alco C630
Alco C636
Montreal Locomotive Works M636

GE Transportation
GE C36-7
GE CM39-8
GE Dash 9-44CW
GE AC6000CW
GE ES44ACi
GE ES44DCi

Electro-Motive Diesel
EMD SD50
EMD SD40R
EMD SD40-2
EMD SD70ACe/lc

Ports
The large-tonnage heavy-duty iron ore shipments require deep-water ports, which have to accommodate very high tidal ranges.
BHP
Port Hedland
Mount Newman

Port Hedland
Goldsworthy – now closed
Shay Gap
Yarrie mine

Rio Tinto
Dampier
Hamersley

Cape Lambert
Robe River

Fortescue Metals Group
Point Anderson near Port Hedland
Christmas Creek mine

In development
Anketell Port, near Cape Lambert

Engineering heritage award 
The heavy haul railways received an Engineering Heritage International Marker from Engineers Australia as part of its Engineering Heritage Recognition Program.

References

External links
Pilbara Railways enthusiast site

Railway lines in the Pilbara
Mining railways in Western Australia
Standard gauge railways in Australia
Recipients of Engineers Australia engineering heritage markers
Iron mining in Australia
Iron ore railways